Laurentius is a Latin given name and surname  that means "From Laurentum" (a city near Rome).

It is possible that the place name Laurentum is derived from the Latin laurus ("laurel").
People with the name include:

In Early Christianity:
 Lawrence of Rome, Saint Laurentius of Rome (died 258), Italian deacon and saint, born in Spain

In Catholicism:
 Antipope Laurentius (r. 498-506), antipope of the Roman Catholic Church
 Laurence of Canterbury, archbishop of Canterbury known as Saint Laurentius
 Lárentíus Kálfsson (1267-1331), bishop of Hólar, Iceland, 1324–1331
 Laurentius Abstemius, Italian writer, Professor of Belles Lettres at Urbino, and Librarian to Duke Guido Ubaldo under Pope Alexander VI
 Laurentia McLachlan, Benedictian nun, Great Britain, 1866–1953

In Byzantium:
 Joannes Laurentius Lydus, Byzantine writer on antiquarian subjects

In Poland:
 Wawrzyniec Grzymała Goślicki, Laurentius Grimaldius Gosliscius, (1530–1607), Polish bishop, political thinker and philosopher best known for his book De optimo senatore

In Lutheranism:

 Laurentius Andreae, Swedish clergyman and scholar
 Laurentius Paulinus Gothus (1565–1646), Swedish theologian, astronomer and Archbishop of Uppsala
 Laurentius Petri (1499–1573), Swedish clergyman and the first Evangelical Lutheran Archbishop of Sweden
 Laurentius Petri Gothus, the second Swedish Lutheran Archbishop of Uppsala, Sweden
 Paul Laurentius (1554–1624), Lutheran divine
 Laurentius Christophori Hornæus, minister and witch hunter in Torsåker and Ytterlännäs, Sweden

In other fields:

 Henrik Laurentius Helliesen, Norwegian Minister of Finance in several periods between 1863 and 1883
 Laurentius (weevil), a beetle genus in the tribe Apostasimerini
 Laurentius "Lou" van den Dries, Dutch mathematician

Variants of Laurentius

Variants  (in various languages) include:

 Lars (Germanic languages)
 Labhrás, Lorcán (Irish)
 Laur (Estonian)
 Laurens (Dutch, French)
 Lauri (Estonian, Finnish)
 Laurits (Danish, Estonian, German)
 Lauritz (Danish, Norwegian)
 Lárus (Icelandic)
 Laurent (French)
 Лаврентий, Лаурентий (Lavrentiy, Russian)
 Лаврентiй, Лаурентiй (Lavrentiy, Ukrainian)
 Λαυρέντιος (Lavrentios, Greek)
 Laurence (English, French)
 Lawrence, Larry, Lawrie (English)
 Loran, Loren (Turkish)
 Lorens (Scandinavian)
 Lorentz, Lorenz, Lenz (German)
 Lorenzo, Lorente, Llorente (Italian, Spanish)
 Laurenti (Italian)
 Լորիս (Loris, Armenian)
 Lourenzo (Galician)
 Lourenço (Portuguese)
 Lourens (Afrikaans)
 Lőrinc (Hungarian)
 Laurențiu, Lorint (Romanian)
 Lauris (Latvian)
 Laurynas (Lithuanian)
 Llorenç (Catalan)
 Vavrinec (Slovak)
 Vavřinec (Czech)
 Wawrzyniec (Polish)
 Lovro, Lovrović, Lovre (Croatian)
 Lovrenc, Lovro, Voranc (Slovenian)
 Lorik, Laurent, Laurat (Albanian)

See also 
 Laureano - Laurean - Laurian
 Lorena (name)

 Laura (given name)
 Laurel (given name)
 Lauren
 Laurie (given name)
 Lorie (disambiguation)
 Lorrie (given name)

 Lauri (given name)
 Lauro (disambiguation)
 Lauret (disambiguation)
 Laurus (disambiguation)

References

Latin masculine given names
Latin-language surnames